Andrew Thomas Wilson (born 1 August 1964 in Sydney) is an Australian slalom canoeist who competed from the mid-1980s to the late 1990s. Competing in two Summer Olympics, he earned his best finish of 14th in the C-2 event in Atlanta in 1996.

In 2014, Wilson completed the Bachelor of Medicine degree at the University of Newcastle.

References
Sports-Reference.com profile

1964 births
Australian male canoeists
Canoeists at the 1992 Summer Olympics
Canoeists at the 1996 Summer Olympics
Living people
Olympic canoeists of Australia
20th-century Australian people